Maryland Marine Properties Wildlife Management Area is a Wildlife Management Area in Somerset County, Maryland.

External links
 Maryland Marine Properties Wildlife Management Area

Wildlife management areas of Maryland
Protected areas of Somerset County, Maryland